WASP-6b is an extrasolar planet approximately 600 light years away in the constellation Aquarius. It was discovered in 2008, by the WASP survey, by astronomical transit across its parent star WASP-6. This planet orbits only 4% that of Earth-Sun distance. The planet has mass half that of Jupiter, but its insolation has forced a thermal expansion of its radius over that of Jupiter. The planet is an inflated Hot Jupiter. Starspots on the host star WASP-6 helped to refine the measurements of the mass and the radius of the planet.

Naming
In 2019 the IAU announced as part of NameExoWorlds that WASP-6 and its planet WASP-6b would be given official names chosen by school children from The Dominican Republic. The planet WASP-6b is named Boinayel. Boinayel is a Taino deity of rain, that fertilizes the soil.

Orbit
The study in 2012, utilizing a Rossiter–McLaughlin effect, have determined the planetary orbit is probably aligned with the equatorial plane of the star, misalignment equal to -11°.

Atmosphere
Observations with the Magellan Telescope in 2013 studied the transits in different wavelengths. The study observed a decrease in transit depth as a function of wavelength, characteristic of a scattering haze. No spectral features were detected. A study in 2015 using Hubble Space Telescope and Spitzer Space Telescope data also found evidence of a scattering haze, but it found tentative evidence for sodium and potassium. A study in 2015, using the Spitzer Space Telescope detected the eclipse of the planet behind the host star. The study found a dayside temperature of  K ( °C) and  K ( °C) for the 3.6 and 4.5 μm channels respectively. A study from 2019 using data from ground based observatories, such as the Very Large Telescope and space telescopes, such as the Transiting Exoplanet Survey Satellite analysed the atmosphere of WASP-6b. This study confirmed the presence of sodium and potassium in the atmosphere. The study also found water vapour in the atmosphere of the planet. The study came to the conclusion that despite the presence of a haze in the atmosphere of WASP-6b, the planet remains a favourable object for future atmospheric characterisation with missions such as JWST.

See also
 SuperWASP or WASP planetary search program

References

External links
 
 WASP primary website

Aquarius (constellation)
Exoplanets discovered in 2009
Exoplanets discovered by WASP
Giant planets
Hot Jupiters
Transiting exoplanets
Exoplanets with proper names

de:WASP-6 b